County Road 901 is a  road in the municipality of Bø in Nordland county, Norway.

The road branches off from County Road 820 at the village of Straume and runs east until it reaches Veanova. There County Road 911 branches off to the north towards the village of Skålbrekka and County Road 820 turns south. After passing Pollåsen, where County Road 909 branches off towards the village of Auvåg, the road runs close to the shore above various bays of the Eidsfjorden before terminating in the village of Straumsnes, where it rejoins County Road 820.

References

External links
Statens vegvesen – trafikkmeldinger Fv901 (Traffic Information: County Road 901)

901
Bø, Nordland